Zac Blair (born August 20, 1990) is an American professional golfer who plays on the PGA Tour He has played on the Korn Ferry Tour and PGA Tour Latinoamerica.

Early life and amateur career
Blair was born in Salt Lake City, Utah. He was on the Brigham Young University's golf team from 2009 to 2013. He was an All-American in 2012 and won four college events. His father, James, played golf at Brigham Young University from 1974 to 1977. Blair also won the 2011 Pacific Northwest Amateur.

Professional career
Blair competed in the 2013 Web.com Tour Qualifying School as an amateur, reaching Final Stage and earning limited status on the Web.com Tour. After turning professional, Blair began playing on PGA Tour Latinoamérica in March 2014. He played in seven events, making the cut six times and finishing in the top-10 three times. He played eight events on the Web.com Tour, making seven cuts including a T-2 finish at the Price Cutter Charity Championship and qualifying for the Web.com Tour Finals. After missing the cut in the first three events, he finished second at the Web.com Tour Championship and earned his PGA Tour card for the 2014–15 season.

On the PGA Tour, his best finish is a solo 3rd at the 2016 Sony Open in Hawaii. He has played in three majors, the 2014 U.S. Open, where he placed T-40 and the 2016 PGA Championship and 2019 U.S. Open, where he missed the cut.

At the 2016 Wells Fargo Championship, Blair was disqualified for hitting himself in the head with a putter, and continuing to use it. He was disqualified for using a non-conforming club.

In the 2018 PGA Tour season, Blair made only 11 cuts in 20 events. He won $330,507 and finished 170th in the season-long FedEx Cup. As a result, he lost his PGA Tour card. Blair then attempted to get his card back via the 2018 Web.com Tour Finals, but was not successful. In October 2018, Blair missed the cut at the Alfred Dunhill Links Championship to fall to 663rd in the world ranking.

On August 4, 2019, Blair won the Ellie Mae Classic at TPC Stonebrae on the Korn Ferry Tour. This win guaranteed that Blair would regain his PGA Tour card for the 2019–20 season.

Amateur wins
2009 Utah Amateur
2011 Pacific Northwest Amateur

Professional wins (2)

Korn Ferry Tour wins (1)

Other wins (1)
2018 Rockford Pro-Am

Results in major championships

CUT = missed the half-way cut
"T" = tied

See also
2014 Web.com Tour Finals graduates
2019 Korn Ferry Tour Finals graduates

References

External links

American male golfers
BYU Cougars men's golfers
PGA Tour Latinoamérica golfers
PGA Tour golfers
Korn Ferry Tour graduates
Golfers from Utah
Sportspeople from Salt Lake City
1990 births
Living people